Joe N. Acinapura (born 13 May 1938, in Union City, New Jersey) is a Republican politician who was elected and currently serves in the Vermont House of Representatives. He represents the Rutland-7 Representative District.

Family
Acinapura is married to Lois and together they have two children named Lauren and Jeanne.

Religion
Acinapura practices the religion of Catholicism.

Education
He received his education from the following institutions:
MA, University of Colorado, 1970
BA, Rutgers University, 1960

Political experience
Joe Acinapura has had the following political experience:
Representatives, Vermont State House of Representatives, 2005–2012
Appointed, Vermont State House of Representatives, November 16, 2005
Chair, Vermont Republican Party, 2003-2004
Candidate, Vermont State Senate, District Addison 1, 1996
Selectman, 1991-1993
Chair, Brandon Select board, 1991-1992

Professional experience
Joe Acinapure has had the following professional experience:
Chair, Vermont Parole Board, State of Vermont, 2005
Auditor, Brandon Fire District, 2003-2005
Coach, Rutland Northeast Supervisory Union Basketball, 2000-2005
Professor, College of St. Joseph, 1992-1997
United States Army, 1961-1989
High School Teacher, 1960-1961

References

1938 births
Living people
Republican Party members of the Vermont House of Representatives
University of Colorado alumni
Rutgers University alumni